Dave Holland / Sam Rivers is an album by American jazz saxophonist Sam Rivers and English double-bassist Dave Holland featuring performances recorded in 1976 and released on the Improvising Artists label.

Reception 

The AllMusic review by Scott Yanow awarded the album 4½ stars, stating, "Rivers' adventurous solos and interplay with the virtuosic Holland make this CD of interest to listeners with open ears toward the avant-garde, despite the LP-length playing time".  

The authors of The Penguin Guide to Jazz Recordings called the album "a finely balanced duo performance which reunites the more interesting axis of Holland's Conference of the Birds quartet... An intriguing album, strongly recommended for anyone who found the ECM quartet compelling."

Track listing

Personnel
Sam Rivers - soprano saxophone (track 1), tenor saxophone (track 2)
Dave Holland - bass

References

External links
Dave Holland's profile on Allaboutjazz.com

Improvising Artists Records albums
Sam Rivers (jazz musician) albums
Dave Holland albums
1976 albums